Edison High School is a secondary school located in the southern part of Stockton, California. It is in the Stockton Unified School District.

History
Opening in 1941, the school is located in a dense urban area in the southern part of Stockton. Edison High School opened in 1941 at what is now the corner of Charter Way, now called Martin Luther King Jr. Blvd, and Center Street. It is named after the American Inventor Thomas Edison. The campus has been expanded through the years, with the addition of major classroom buildings and a library in the 1970s. Starting with the 2009–2010 school year, Edison will start its classes as Small Learning Communities or SLC's.

Alma Mater
Edison, our Alma mater, give forth thy light. Guide us to knowledge, wisdom, and right. Wherever we may wander, let us never fail. Edison forever, Alma mater hail.

Athletics
The Vikings compete at Division 1 level in the CIF. They are a member of the San Joaquin Athletic Association and part of the Sac-Joaquin Section.

Notable alumni

 Darren Arbet, arena football, current head coach of the San Jose Sabercats and 4-time Arena Bowl champion
 Nakia Burrise, American Actress most known for her role as Tanya Sloan, the Yellow Zeo Ranger in Power Rangers Zeo and the Yellow Turbo Ranger in Power Rangers Turbo She attended UCLA after graduating from Edison.
 Dennis Edwards, former defensive end for the Los Angeles Rams 
 John Gianelli, former forward/center for the New York Knicks (1972–1976), Buffalo Braves (1976–1977), Milwaukee Bucks (1977–1979) and Utah Jazz (1979)
 Lynell Hamilton, former running back for the New Orleans Saints.
 Willard Harrell, former running back for the Green Bay Packers and St. Louis Cardinals.
 Lavelle Hawkins, current wide receiver for the Tampa Bay Buccaneers.
 Chris Henry, running back for NFL's Tennessee Titans, Houston Texans and Seattle Seahawks.
 Fred Heron, former defensive lineman for the St. Louis Cardinals.
 J. D. Hill, former wide receiver for the Buffalo Bills and Detroit Lions of the National Football League.
 Trumaine Johnson, former cornerback for the New York Jets.
 Derek Kennard, former guard and center for the National Football League and United States Football League.
 Maxine Hong Kingston, wrote The Woman Warrior: Memoirs of a Girlhood Among Ghosts 
 Patrick Kinser-Lau, Broadway actor
 Dawn Mabalon, historian and professor
 John Nisby, former NFL guard with the Pittsburgh Steelers and Washington Redskins. One of the first African American players to play for the Washington Redskins.
 Saint Saffold, football player

References

External links
 Edison High School website
 Edison High School website
 Edison High Class of 1961 - 50 Year Reunion website
 Edison High School Master Plan

Educational institutions established in 1941
High schools in San Joaquin County, California
Public high schools in California
1941 establishments in California
Education in Stockton, California